The New Zealand national rugby sevens team competes in the World Rugby Sevens Series, Rugby World Cup Sevens, Summer Olympic Games and the Commonwealth Games. They have won a record thirteen World Rugby Sevens Series titles.

The team played for the first time at the 1973 International Seven-A-Side Tournament.

History

World Sevens Series 
The All Blacks Sevens have won 13 of the 21 World Rugby Sevens Series, and have been the most successful team in the history of the world series. They won the first six series between 1999–2004, before placing 4th in the 2005 series, and then later winning back to back series again in the 2006–2007 seasons. In 2008, the team placed 4th for the second time, and were runners-up for the first ever time in 2009. In the years of 2010–2013, the All Blacks Sevens had another period of success by winning all 4 of those series, before going onto have 5 straight seasons without winning a series between 2014–2018, which saw them come in 3rd place a total of 4 times and placed 4th once, which is also the third time that they have placed 4th in a world series. In 2019, the team won its first series again since 2013, and it was followed by a Covid-19 disrupted 2020–21 season, which was then followed by a disappointing 2021–22 series, that saw them come in 8th place, which was the lowest that the team has ever placed in any of the World Sevens Series.

Summer Olympic Games 
The All Blacks Sevens have only been in 2 tournaments at the Summer Olympics, but have failed to obtain a Gold Medal from either competitions. In 2016, they were eliminated in the Quarter-Finals by Fiji before finishing in 5th place by beating Argentina (17–14) in the 5th place final. In 2020, they improved from the previous tournament and made it to the Grand Final but they were beaten by Fiji once again by (27–12). This caused them to finish the tournament in 2nd place due to being runners-up by losing in the final.

Rugby World Cup Sevens 
New Zealand have won 3 Sevens Rugby World Cups. Their first appearance was in the 1993 tournament which was held in Scotland. They were knocked out in the Quarter-Finals by the eventual winners England (21–12) before finishing in 7th place. In 1997, they placed 3rd after they were beaten in the Semi-Finals by South Africa (31–7). In 2001, they won their first World Cup by beating Australia (31–12), and would also make the final again in 2005 but went on to lose to Fiji (29–19). In 2009, they lost to Wales in the Quarter-Finals (15–14) and would finish in 5th place. They then would go on to win the next two World Cups in 2013 and 2018 by beating England in both tournaments (33–0) and (33–12), to become the first team in history to go back to back in consecutive tournaments. In 2022, they lost to Fiji in the final once again by (27–12), and finished runners-up for the second time in their World Cup history.

Commonwealth Games 
New Zealand have found the most success in the Commonwealth Games Sevens Series by winning 5 out of the 7 Tournaments. They won in 1998 by beating Fiji in the final (21–12), won in 2002 by winning against Fiji again (33–15), beat England in the 2006 Final (29–21), before beating Australia in the final in 2010 (24–17) and would go on to beat Fiji for the 3rd consecutive time in the final (14–0). In 2014, they were runners-up after losing to England (12–17) in the final and came in 3rd place after losing to Fiji (14–19) in the Semi-Finals in the 2022 tournament.

Oceania Sevens 
The All Blacks sevens have only been the Oceania Sevens Champions once which was in 2022 after having the best round-robin record of (5–1). They have been runners-up 4 times, the first being in 2014 by losing to Fiji in the final (5–21), the second time was in 2017 when they lost to Fiji again in the final (0–26), the third time was in 2018, when they lost to Fiji again for the 3rd straight final (12–17), and the 4th time would be by having the 2nd best round-robin record in 2021 (4–2), behind Fiji who had a better record (6–0), and they would also finish the 2019 competition in 7th place.

Records

World Sevens Series 

New Zealand have won the World Rugby Sevens Series a record 13 times. New Zealand were particularly dominant in the early years of the Series, winning the first six series.

Summer Olympic Games 
New Zealand have competed in 2 Summer Olympics Sevens Tournaments but have failed to win a Gold Medal in both competitions.

Rugby World Cup Sevens
New Zealand is tied with Fiji for the most Rugby Sevens World Cups with each team having 3 titles.

Commonwealth Games 
New Zealand is the most successful rugby sevens team at the Commonwealth Games. They have won five of the seven Commonwealth Games tournaments so far, and have finished second once. The team have only lost 2 matches at the Commonwealth Games, losing to South Africa in the final of the 2014 tournament and losing to Fiji in the semi finals in the 2022 tournament.

Oceania Sevens
New Zealand have won the Oceania Sevens once, while they have been runners-up 4 times and also came in 7th place in the 2019 tournament.

Players

Current squad
Squad named for the 2023 World Rugby HSBC Sevens Series in Vancouver from the 3–5 of March.

Caps updated to the latest date: 5 March 2023

Player records 
The following shows leading career New Zealand players based on performance in the World Rugby Sevens Series. Players in bold are still active.

Awards

Several New Zealand players have won or been nominated for the World Rugby Sevens Player of the Year award. The following table shows the players who have been nominated for the award at least twice and won the award at least once.

Coaches 
Clark Laidlaw (head coach)
Junior Tomasi Cama (assistant coach)
Euan Mackintosh (assistant coach)

Past coaches

See also
 List of New Zealand rugby sevens internationals
 All Blacks

References

External links
 
 WorldRugby profile

 
National rugby sevens teams
New Zealand national rugby union team
All Blacks Sevens team